The Volta a la Comunitat Valenciana (or Tour of Valencia) is a road cycling stage race held in the Valencian Community (Comunitat Valenciana), Spain. Its position in the cycling calendar means it is often used as preparation for the spring classics or the Grand Tours which take place later in the season.

No editions of the race were held between 2008 and 2015 because of funding issues. A first attempt to revive it for the 2010–11 UCI Europe Tour was unsuccessful. During 2015 a second attempt was started by Ángel Casero and his brother Rafael. In September the UCI granted the race a 2.1 status and made way for the return of the race which took place in early February. The race became part of the new UCI ProSeries in 2020.

Results

Previous winners

Multiple winners

Classifications
As of the 2021 edition, the jerseys worn by the leaders of the individual classifications are:
  Yellow Jersey – Worn by the leader of the general classification.
  Orange Jersey – Worn by the leader of the points classification.
  Polkadot Jersey – Worn by the leader of the climber classification. 
  White Jersey – Worn by the best rider under 23 years of age on the overall classification.

References
General

Specific

 
UCI Europe Tour races
Cycle races in Spain
Recurring sporting events established in 1929
1929 establishments in Spain
Sport in the Valencian Community